Berkeley Square is a 1959 American TV film based on the play Berkeley Square by John L. Balderston. It was presented on the Hallmark Hall of Fame and directed by George Schaefer.

Plot

Cast
John Colicos
Edna Best
Janet Munro
John Kerr

Reception
The Los Angeles Times said "the cast was largely inept" except for Janet Munro.

References

External links
Berkeley Square at IMDb

1959 television films
1959 films
Films directed by George Schaefer
Hallmark Hall of Fame episodes
American television films
Films based on works by John L. Balderston